Lasionemopoda is a genus of flies in the family Sepsidae.

Species
Lasionemopoda hirsuta (Meijere, 1906)

References

Sepsidae
Diptera of Australasia
Taxa named by Oswald Duda
Brachycera genera